The 1970 NCAA Skiing Championships were contested at the Cannon Mountain Ski Area in Franconia, New Hampshire, at the seventeenth annual NCAA-sanctioned ski tournament to determine the individual and team national champions of men's collegiate alpine skiing, cross-country skiing, and ski jumping in the United States.

Denver, coached by Willy Schaeffler, captured their thirteenth national championship and ninth in ten years. Denver finished 7.8 points ahead of runners-up Dartmouth in the team standings, the second straight year the Pioneers bested the Big Green.

Venue

This year's NCAA skiing championships were held March 4–7 in New Hampshire at Cannon Mountain Ski Area near Franconia.

The seventeenth edition, these were the second at Cannon Mountain (1964) and third in New Hampshire (1958). The 1964 championships were scheduled for Dartmouth Skiway, but rain forced the transfer of the alpine events to Cannon Mountain.

Team scoring

Individual events

Four events were held, which yielded seven individual titles.
Wednesday: Giant Slalom (1st run)
Thursday: Giant Slalom (2nd run), Cross Country
Friday: Slalom
Saturday: Jumping

 ^ A giant slalom (2 runs) replaced the downhill

See also
List of NCAA skiing programs

References

NCAA Skiing Championships
NCAA Skiing Championships
NCAA Skiing Championships
NCAA Skiing Championships
NCAA Skiing Championships
NCAA Skiing Championships
NCAA Skiing Championships
Skiing in New Hampshire